The Rural Municipality of Brokenshell No. 68 is a rural municipality (RM) in the Canadian province of Saskatchewan within Census Division No. 2 and  Division No. 2. It is located in the southeast portion of the province.

History 
The RM of Brokenshell No. 68 incorporated as a rural municipality on December 13, 1909.

Geography

Communities and localities 
The following unincorporated communities are located within the RM.

Organized hamlets
 Trossachs

Localities
 Abbott
 Axford
 Brightmore
 Clearfield
 Yeoman

Demographics 

Government 
The RM of Brokenshell No. 68 is governed by an elected municipal council and an appointed administrator that meets on the first Thursday of every month. The reeve of the RM is Garry Christopherson while its administrator is Jenna Smolinski. The RM's office is located in Weyburn. The RM's office was located in Trossachs until 1998 when permission was received to share offices with the RM of Weyburn No. 67, though technical operations remain in Trossachs.

References 

B

Division No. 2, Saskatchewan